John Joseph Tracey (June 27, 1933 – September 21, 1978) was an American football linebacker.  At Texas A&M University, Tracey held school records for most receptions and most yards receiving.  Another "NFL Reject", when he joined the American Football League's Buffalo Bills in 1962, Lou Saban liked his speed and agility, and used him at linebacker, where with Harry Jacobs and Mike Stratton he filled out the AFL's best linebacking crew, playing together for 62 consecutive games from 1963 through 1967, a professional football record.  They helped the formidable front four hold opposing teams without a 100-yard rusher for seventeen consecutive games in 1964 and 1965, and achieved American Football League championships in both those years.  In 1963, he led the team with five interceptions.  Tracey was an AFL All-Star in 1965 and 1966. He died on September 21, 1978 from lung cancer.

See also
Other American Football League players

References

External links
Tracey's citation in the American Football League Hall of Fame

American football wide receivers
American football linebackers
Texas A&M Aggies football players
Chicago Cardinals players
St. Louis Cardinals (football) players
Philadelphia Eagles players
Buffalo Bills players
American Football League All-Star players
1933 births
1978 deaths
American Football League players